Ahmad is an Arabic male given name common in most parts of the Muslim world. Other spellings of the name include Ahmed and Ahmet.

Etymology 
The word derives from the root  (ḥ-m-d), from the Arabic , from the verb  (ḥameda, "to thank or to praise"), non-past participle .

Lexicology 
As an Arabic name, it has its origins in a Quranic prophecy attributed to Jesus in the Quran   which most Islamic scholars concede is about Muhammad. It also shares the same roots as Mahmud, Muhammad and Hamed. In its transliteration, the name has one of the highest number of spelling variations in the world. Though Islamic scholars attribute the name Ahmed to Muhammed, the verse itself is about a Messenger named Ahmed, whilst Muhammed was a Messenger-Prophet.

Some Islamic traditions view the name Ahmad as another given name of Muhammad at birth by his mother, considered by Muslims to be the more esoteric name of Muhammad and central to understanding his nature. Over the centuries, some Islamic scholars have suggested the name's parallel is in the word 'Paraclete' from the Biblical text, although this view is not universal considering translations, meanings and etymology.

Traditional Islamic sources, such as Sahih al-Bukhari, Sahih Muslim, and others contain hadith in which Muhammad personally refers to himself as Ahmad. Christian orientalist such as William Montgomery Watt, however, tried to argue that the use of Ahmad as a proper name for "Muhammad" did not exist until well into the second Islamic century, previously being used only in an adjectival sense. But his argument is weak,as Muhammad had called himself Ahmad. And Watt didn't give any reference on behalf of his claim. As in Sahih Bukhari, 3532:

Watt concludes that the development of the term being used as a name in reference to Muhammad came later in the context of Christian-Muslim polemics, particularly with Muslim attempts to equate Muhammad with the Biblical 'Paraclete', owing to a prophecy attributed to Jesus in the Quranic verse 61:6.

Interpretations and meanings of Ahmad

Development 
Regarding Ibn Ishaq's biography of Muhammad, the Sirat Rasul Allah, Islamic scholar Alfred Guillaume wrote:

Ahmad passage 
Here are two translations of the passage in question in Surat 61 verse 6:

The verse in the Quran attributes a name or designation, describing or identifying who would follow Jesus.  In his Farewell Discourse to his disciples, Jesus promised that he would "send the Holy Spirit" to them after his departure, in John 15:26 stating: "whom I will send unto you from the Father, [even] the Spirit of truth... shall bear witness of me." John 14:17 states "[even] the Spirit of truth: whom the world cannot receive; for it beholdeth him not, neither knoweth him: ye know him; for he abideth with you, and shall be in you."

Regarding verse 61: 6 in the Quran:

Contrary to the above claim that Ibn Ishaq and Ibn Hisham did not mention Ahmad and the respective passage, there is Ibn Ishaq's work with the title Kitab al-Maghazi and Ibn Hisham who mention and connect the words Mohammad & Ahmad with the Paraclete. Additionally it has been documented that there was an attempt to connect the respective quranic verse with the Paraclete even earlier then Ibn Ishaq. Moreover, a later interpolation of this passage to the Quran, just to serve as an ex eventu prove for the early Muslim scholars, has also been refuted in modern Islamic Studies. This is supported by the fact that the earliest as well as the later manuscripts of the Quran contain the exact passage and wording in Surah 61.

Scholarship regarding the Greek translation 
"Early translators knew nothing about the surmised reading of periklutos for parakletos, and its possible rendering as Ahmad …. Periklutos does not come into the picture as far as Ibn Ishaq and Ibn Hisham are concerned. The deception is not theirs. The opportunity to introduce Ahmad was not accepted – though it is highly improbable that they were aware of it being a possible rendering of Periklutos. It would have clinched the argument to have followed the Johannine references with a Quranic quotation."

"Furthermore the Peshitta, Old Syriac, and Philoxenian versions all write the name of John in the form Yuhanan, not in the Greek form Yuhannis.. Accordingly to find a text of the Gospels from which Ibn Ishaq could have drawn his quotation we must look for a version which differs from all others in displaying these characteristics. Such a text is the Palestinian Syriac Lectionary of the Gospels which will conclusively prove that the Arabic writer had a Syriac text before him which he, or his informant, skillfully manipulated to provide the reading we have in the Sira.".

"Muslim children are never called Ahmad before the year 123AH. But there are many instances prior to this date of boys called 'Muhammad.' Very rarely is the name 'Ahmad' met with in pre-Islamic time of ignorance (Jahiliya), though the name Muhammad was in common use. Later traditions that the prophet's name was Ahmad show that this had not always been obvious, though commentators assume it after about 22 (AH)."

"It has been concluded that the word Ahmad in Quran as-Saff 61:6 is to be taken not as a proper name but as an adjective... and that it was understood as a proper name only after Muhammad had been identified with the Paraclete."

"Note that by the middle of the 2nd century AH, Muslims already identified Muhammad with the Greek word "Paracletos" (Counsellor / Advocate) or the Aramaic translation "Menahhemana."

Alleged historical document regarding the topic 
Text of the correspondence between `Umar II and Leo III:

"We recognize Matthew, Mark, Luke, and John as the authors of the Gospel, and yet I know that this truth, recognized by us Christians wounds you, so that you seek to find accomplices for your lie. In brief, you admit that we say that it was written by God, and brought down from the heavens, as you pretend for your Furqan, although we know that it was `Umar, Abu Turab and Salman the Persian, who composed that, even though the rumor has got round among you that God sent it down from heavens…. [God] has chosen the way of sending [the human race] Prophets, and it is for this reason that the Lord, having finished all those things that He had decided on beforehand, and having fore-announced His incarnation by way of His prophets, yet knowing that men still had need of assistance from God, promised to send the Holy Spirit, under the name of Paraclete, (Consoler), to console them in the distress and sorrow they felt at the departure of their Lord and Master. I reiterate, that it was for this cause alone that Jesus called the Holy Spirit the Paraclete, since He sought to console His disciples for His departure, and recall to them all that He had said, all that He had done before their eyes, all that they were called to propagate throughout the world by their witness. Paraclete thus signifies "consoler", while Muhammad means "to give thanks", or "to give grace", a meaning which has no connection whatever with the word Paraclete."

However the authenticity of the correspondence has been put into question by scholars.

Transliterations 
Ahmad is the most elementary transliteration. It is used commonly all over the Muslim world, although primarily in the Middle East. More recently, this transliteration has become increasingly popular in the United States due to use by members of the African American community.

Ahmed is the most common variant transliteration, used especially in the context of the Ottoman Empire. This transliteration is also used throughout the Muslim world.

Ahmet is the modern Turkish transliteration. Modern Turkish uses a Latin-based alphabet, and most Arabic-derived names have standardized Turkish spellings.

The less common transliterations of Ahmad are used by Muslims outside the Middle East proper, such as in Indonesia and Russia.

Achmat is the fairly standard transliteration used by South Africa's Muslim community, and its pronunciation shows evidence of the influence of Afrikaans: the <ch> which represents ح [ħ] is pronounced as an Afrikaans <g> [x] (i.e. closer to the Arabic خ); and the د [d] is realised as a [t] (closer to the Arabic ت) which follows Afrikaans Final-obstruent devoicing principles.

List of people with the name

Ahmad 
Ahmad ibn Hanbal, (780–855) was an Arab Muslim jurist, theologian, ascetic, hadith traditionist, and founder of the Hanbali school of Islamic jurisprudence. 
Ahmad ibn Isma'il ibn Ali al-Hashimi, was an Abbasid provincial governor who was active in the late eighth century.
Ahmad ibn al-Mu'tasim, was an Abbasid prince and son of Abbasid caliph Al-Mu'tasim. He was also patron of Science, philosophy and Art.
Ahmad ibn Muhammad, (died 866) better known as Al-Musta'in was the twelfth Abbasid caliph (r. 862–866).
Ahmad Shah Durrani, Founder of Last Afghan Durrani Empire 
Ahmad Shah Bahadur, Mughal Emperor 
Sheikh Ahmad, Siamese official of Persian ancestry
Ahmad (rapper), West Coast hip hop performer
Ahmad Abbas, Saudi Arabian footballer
Ahmad Abdalla, Egyptian film director
Ahmad Adel, Egyptian footballer
Ahmad Ahmadi, Iranian physician
Ahmad Ismail Ali (1917–1974), Egyptian army officer
Ahmad Alaq, Khan of eastern Moghulistan
Ahmad Amin, Egyptian historian and writer
Ahmad A'zam, Uzbek writer
Ahmed Ibrahim Artan, Somali diplomat, author and politician
Ahmad ibn Ibrahim al-Ghazi, The Somali Imam of Adal Sultanate who conquered Abyssinia 
Ahmad Bahar, Iranian politician
Ahmad Balshe, Palestinian-Canadian rapper, singer, songwriter, and record producer known professionally as Belly
Ahmad Belal, Egyptian former football player
Ahmad Black, American football safety for the Florida Gators
Ahmad Bradshaw, American football running back for the Indianapolis Colts, released via free agency from the New York Giants
Ahmad Brooks, American football linebacker for the San Francisco 49ers
Ahmad Bunnag of Siam
Ahmad Bustomi, Indonesian footballer
Ahmad Carroll, American football free agent
Ahmad Dahlan, Indonesian Islamic revivalist
Ahmad Dhani, Indonesian musician
Ahmad Dukhqan, Jordanian politician
Ahmad Fanakati, financial officer of Kublai Khan's Yuan Dynasty
Ahmad Fuadi, Indonesian writer
Ahmad "Sauce" Gardner (born 2000), American football player
Ahmad Gooden (born 1995), American football player
Ahmad Hardi, Kurdish poet
Ahmad Hawkins, American football defensive back for the Alabama Vipers
Ahmad Hijazi (born 1994), Lebanese footballer
Ahmad ibn Hanbal, Founder of the Hanbalite school of Muslim jurisprudence
Ahmad ibn Fadlan, Abbasid ambassador to the Volga Bulgars
Ahmad ibn Tulun, founder of the Tulunid dynasty
Ahmad-Jabir Ahmadov, "Honored teacher" of Azerbaijan
Ahmad Jalloul (born 1992), Lebanese footballer
Ahmad Jamal, American jazz pianist
Ahmad Sayyed Javadi, Iranian lawyer and politician
Ahmad Karami (1944–2020), Lebanese politician
Ahmad Kasravi, Iranian linguists and historian
Ahmad Khatib, first Masjid al-Haram Imam of Indonesian origin
Ahmad Maher (disambiguation), various people
Ahmad Majid, Mughal faujdar of Sylhet
Ahmad Mohammad Hasher Al Maktoum
Ahmad Miller, former defensive tackle for the National Football League
Ahmad Mirfendereski (1918–2004), Iranian diplomat
Ahmad Merritt, American football free agent
Ahmad Muin Yaacob, Malaysian convicted murderer
 Ahmad Nafisi (1919–2004), Iranian bureaucrat and mayor of Tehran (1961–1963)
Ahmad Nivins, American basketball player
Ahmad ibn Rustah, Persian chronicler born in Isfahan, Persia
Ahmad Rashad, sportscaster and former football player
Ahmad Al Abdullah Al Sabah (born 1952), Kuwaiti royal and politician
Ahmad Sa'adat, Secretary-General of the Popular Front for the Liberation of Palestine
Ahmad Saad, a Saudi Arabian football player.
Ahmad Said (politician), Malaysian politician
Ahmad Ali Sepehr, Iranian historian and politician
Ahmad Shah Massoud, Afghan military leader Deputy Justice on the Supreme Court of Afghanistan
Ahmad Shah Qajar, Last Shah of the Qajar dynasty
Ahmad Shamlou, Persian poet and writer
Ahmad Shukeiri, first Chairman of the Palestine Liberation Organization
Ahmad Sohrab, Persian author
Ahmad Syafi'i Maarif, Indonesian intellectual
Ahmad Tajuddin, 27th Sultan of Brunei
Ahmad Taktouk (born 1984), Lebanese footballer
Ahmad Tekuder (died 1284), leader of the Mongol Ilkhanate
Ahmad Tejan Kabbah, President of Sierra Leone
Ahmad bin Ali Al Thani, Emir of the State of Qatar
Ahmad Thomas (born 1994), American football player
Ahmad Treaudo, American football cornerback for the California Redwoods
Ahmad Yani, Indonesian Army general
Ahmad Zarruq, Shadhili Sufi Sheikh
Ahmad Yaakob, Malaysian politician; Menteri Besar of Kelantan
Ahmad Najib Aris, Malaysian convicted rapist and killer who was hanged for the rape and murder of Canny Ong
 Ahmad Lawan, President of the Senate of Nigeria

Surname
 Alimuddin Ahmad (1884-1920), Bengali activist and revolutionary
 Ekramuddin Ahmad (1872-1940), Bengali litterateur
 Khondaker Mostaq Ahmad (1918 - 1996), Bangladeshi politician
 Nesaruddin Ahmad (1873-1952), Bengali Islamic scholar and Pir of Sarsina
 Feroz Ahmad (born 1938), Indian academic and historian
 Najm Hamad Al Ahmad (born 1969), Syrian politician
 Ricky Ahmad Subagja, Indonesian badminton player

Fictional characters
 Aĥmad, from Malatily Bathhouse

Ahmed 
 Ahmed I, sultan of the Ottoman Empire
 Ahmed II, sultan of the Ottoman Empire
 Ahmed III, sultan of the Ottoman Empire
 Ahmed Abdel Wahab Pasha (1889–1938), Egyptian economist
 Ahmed Abukhater, urban and regional planner and Palestinian-American powerlifter
 Ahmed Ahmed, Egyptian American actor and comedian
 Ahmed Arif (1927–1991), Turkish poet
 Ahmed Ali Awan (born 1980), convicted of the racially motivated murder of Ross Parker
 Ahmed Baduri, Eritrean diplomat
 Ahmed Chalabi, leader of the Iraqi National Congress
 Ahmed Hassan al-Bakr, former President of Iraq
 Ahmed Ben Bella, the first President of Algeria
 Ahmed Sheikh Ali "Burale", Somali writer and politician
 Ahmed Galal (politician) (born 1948), Egyptian economist 
 Ahmed al-Ghamdi (1979–2001), Saudi hijacker of United Airlines Flight 175
 Ahmed al-Haznawi (1980–2001), Saudi hijacker of United Airlines Flight 93
 Ahmed Hulusi, Turkish writer and Sufi
 Ahmed Hussein (disambiguation), multiple people
 Ahmed Hussen, Somali-Canadian lawyer
 Ahmed Imamovic, Bosnian film director
 Ahmed Abu Ismail, Egyptian economist and politician
 Ahmed Mohamed Kathrada (1929–2017), South African politician, political prisoner and anti-apartheid activist.
 Ahmed Khadr, Egyptian-Canadian senior associate and financier of al-Qaeda
 Ahmed Raza Khan Barelvi, Mujaddid of 14th century of Islam
 Ahmed Köprülü, Ottoman Grand Vizier of the Köprülü family
 Ahmed bin Rashid Al Maktoum, United Arab Emirati politician
 Ahmed bin Saeed Al Maktoum, United Arab Emirati businessman
 Ahmed M. Hassan Somali politician
 Ahmed Marei, Egyptian basketball coach and former player
 Ahmed Mohiuddin, Pakistani biologist
 Ahmed Musa, Nigerian footballer
 Ahmed Naamani (born 1979), Lebanese footballer
 Ahmed Nadeem, cricketer
 Ahmed bin Saif Al Nahyan, founder and chairman of Etihad Airways
 Ahmed bin Zayed Al Nahyan, Emirati businessman
 Ahmed al-Nami (1977–2001), Saudi hijacker of United Airlines Flight 93
 Ahmed Nazif (born 1952), Egyptian politician
 Ahmed Nizam, Indian cricketer
 Ahmed Elmi Osman, Somali politician
 Ahmed Patel, Indian politician
 Ahmed Plummer, former NFL player
 Ahmed Rushdi, Pakistani singer
 Ahmed Rushdi, Egyptian politician
 Ahmed bin Salman Al Saud, member of the royal family of Saudi Arabia
 Ahmed Sanjar, ruler of the Seljuk Turks
 Ahmed Santos, Mexican newspaper columnist
 Ahmed Al Saqr (born 1970), Lebanese footballer
 Ahmed Şerafettin, Turkish football manager
 Ahmed Sheikh, Palestinian journalist
 Ahmed Talbi, Moroccan footballer
 Ahmed bin Abdullah Al Thunayan (1889–1923), Turkish born Saudi royal
 Ahmed Sékou Touré, African political leader and president of the Republic of Guinea
 Ahmed Yassin, former leader of Palestinian Hamas
 Ahmed Yesevi, leader of Sufi mysticism
 Ahmed H. Zewail, the winner of the 1999 Nobel Prize in Chemistry for his work on femtochemistry
 Ahmed Bola Tinubu, President-elect of Nigeria

 Surname
 Nick Ahmed (born 1990), American baseball player
 Riz Ahmed (born 1982), British actor and rapper

Ahmet
 Ahmet Akdilek (born 1988), Turkish cyclist
 Ahmet Alkan, Turkish economist
 Ahmet Almaz, Turkish journalist
 Ahmet Bilek (1932–1971), Turkish Olympic champion
 Ahmet Bozer (born 1960), Turkish business executive
 Ahmet Cevdet, multiple people
 Ahmet Cömert (1926–1990), Turkish amateur boxer, coach, referee, boxing judge and sports official
 Ahmet Davutoğlu (born 1959), Turkish politician and political scientist
 Ahmet Dursun (born 1978), Turkish footballer
 Ahmet Enünlü (born 1948), Turkish bodybuilder
 Ahmet Burak Erdoğan (born 1979), son of Turkish President Recep Tayyip Erdoğan
 Ahmet Ertegun (923–2006), Turkish American founder and president of Atlantic Records
 Ahmet Gülhan (born 1978), Turkish wrestler
 Ahmet Haşim (1884–1933), Turkish writer
 Ahmet Hromadžić (1923–2003), Bosnian writer
 Ahmet İsvan (1923–2017), Turkish politician
 Ahmet Kaya (1957–2000), Turkish–Kurdish folk singer
 Ahmet Mete Işıkara (1941–2013), Turkish seismologist
 Ahmet İzzet Pasha (1864–1937), Ottoman general
 Ahmet Kireççi (1914–1979), Turkish sports wrestler
 Ahmet Koç, Turkish musician
 Ahmet Köksal, (1920-1997), Turkish poet and writer
 Ahmet Kuru (born 1982), Turkish footballer
 Ahmet Li (born 1991), Chinese-Turkish table tennis player
 Ahmet Öcal (born 1979), Belgian footballer
 Ahmet Örken (born 1993), Turkish cyclist
 Ahmet Suat Özyazıcı (born 1936), Turkish footballer
 Ahmet Peker (born 1989), Turkish wrestler
 Ahmet Rasim, Turkish writer and politician
 Ahmet Sağlam (born 1987), Turkish footballer
 Ahmet Necdet Sezer (born 1941), tenth President of the Republic of Turkey
 Ahmet Burak Solakel (born 1982), Turkish footballer
 Ahmet Hamdi Tanpınar (1901–1962), Turkish writer
 Ahmet Türk (born 1942), Turkish politician
 Ahmet Fikri Tüzer (1878–1942), Turkish politician
 Ahmet Ümit (born 1960), Turkish author
 Ahmet Uzel (1930–1998), Turkish composer
 Ahmet Üzümcü (born 1951), Turkish diplomat
 Ahmet Uzun, Turkish Cypriot politician
 Ahmet Vardar (1937–2010), Turkish journalist
 Ahmet Emin Yalman (1888–1972), Turkish journalist
 Ahmet Yıldırım (born 1974), Turkish footballer
 Ahmet Yıldız (born 1979), Turkish scientist
 Ahmet Zappa (born 1974), American musician, actor and novelist
 Ahmet Zogu, King of Albania (1928-1939)

Other spellings 
 Achmad Jufriyanto, Indonesian footballer
 Achmad Nawir, Dutch East Indies footballer
 Achmad Saba'a, Arab-Israeli footballer
 Achmad Soebardjo, Indonesian diplomat
 Achmat Dangor, South African writer
 Achmed Abdullah, Russian writer
 Achmed Akkabi, Moroccan-Dutch presenter and actor
 Achmed Labasanov, Russian mixed martial artist
 Achmet (oneiromancer), Occultist
 Ahmat Acyl, Chadian Arab insurgent leader
 Ahmat Brahim, Chadian footballer
 Ahmat Taboye, Chadian writer
 Akhmed Avtorkhanov, Chechen leader
 Akhmad Kadyrov, First President of the Chechen Republic
 Akhmed Zakayev, Prime Minister of the Chechen Republic
 Ahmaud Arbery, African American murder victim

 Surname
 Rosli Ahmat (1970–2002), Singaporean armed robber and murderer

References 

Arabic-language surnames
Arabic masculine given names
Bengali Muslim surnames
Bosniak masculine given names
Iranian masculine given names
Masculine given names
Pakistani masculine given names
Turkish-language surnames
Turkish masculine given names
Urdu-language surnames
Given names